Trinity Parish is an historic Episcopal Church at the corner of King and Saint George streets in downtown St. Augustine, Florida. It is the oldest Protestant church in Florida and has some of the oldest and most beautiful stained glass windows in the Episcopal Diocese of Florida.

History
The parish of Trinity, St. Augustine was founded in 1821 soon after Florida became a United States territory. Trinity is one of the seven original parishes when the Episcopal Diocese of Florida was received into union with the General Convention in 1838.

The first church building was begun in 1830 and services began on June 30, 1831. Bishop Nathaniel Bowen of South Carolina formally consecrated Trinity Church on June 5, 1834.

Growth was slow but steady in the years following and small additions and improvements were made to the church. Three stained glass windows were added just prior to the American Civil War. Although there was only one major battle in Florida, the war took a terrible toll on the state, the Diocese of Florida and Trinity.

The next 50 years saw a slow recovery by St. Augustine and Trinity, with continued work by a committed laity that raised funds to keep the church going through a succession of Rectors. The Rev. C M. Sturges arrived in 1895 and determined that the church building was outmoded, too small and in dire need of repair. That began a six-year effort to obtain plans and funding to enlarge the church structure. Work began in early 1902 and on January 17, 1903, the first services were held in the “new” church, a cruciform structure, neo-gothic in appearance that seated 300 parishioners. A new era had begun.

The 20th century brought profound changes to St. Augustine including a substantial increase in population and a steady rise in winter visitors – many of whom chose Trinity as their church. The Reverend L. Fitz-James Hindry served as Rector from 1904 until 1936. His tenure saw the formation of many lay organizations - the Altar Guild, Daughters of the king, St. Catherine’s Guild, and others – all devoted to working with the church on a variety of projects.

The Rev. Charles Seymour was called to Trinity 1949 and served until 1964. By 1955, a two-story education facility and Parish Hall were added. The Seymour years were a time of significant physical changes to Trinity and marked an upturn in the number of communicants to more than 500 by 1959. In 1960, after a successful stewardship campaign, Trinity Parish went from a relatively small church to a full complex with a new parish hall, kitchen, classrooms, administrative offices and a nursery. Architecturally, the new facilities and cloistered walkways complemented and continued the neo-gothic features of the historic church building.

The Rev. Canon Walter T. Saffran served as rector during the 1980s and into the 1990s and membership continued to increase.  St. Monica Chapter of the Daughters of the King was established February 18, 1996. When Father Saffran retired in 1997, he was named Trinity Episcopal Parish Rector Emeritus.  Fr. David Weidner served Trinity from 2005-2018. The present Rector is the Rev. Matt Marino.

Trinity Hall
In the early 21st century the building adjacent to the church was purchased to serve the large congregation and the community. The new building was named Trinity Hall and is now the meeting and gathering place of church activities, including the monthly Parish Breakfast, Wednesday dinners, special celebrations and receptions, some functions of Cursillo, Ultreya, Daughters of the King, Brotherhood of St. Andrew, Youth Group, River Region meetings and Diocesan meetings. It is an integral part of the ministries of Trinity Episcopal Parish.

Stained glass
Windows have been placed in Trinity Episcopal Church for almost 150 years beginning in 1859. Ten windows, including the Triptych above the altar were made by Franz Mayer & Co. of Munich, Germany. There is a Louis Comfort Tiffany window as well as windows made by Maitland, Armstrong, Rudy Bro, Henry Payne, Burnham, Colgate and Jacoby. Two windows were given as general thank offerings, twenty six are memorials to loved ones: wives, husbands, sons, other family members and rectors.

The original purpose of stained glass windows was to teach the great truths of religion, rather than adornment. Since most people could neither read nor write, the windows were used to explain the meaning of scripture and symbols.

The windows of Trinity call to mind many great biblical figures and events. Jesus is pictured three times as the Good Shepherd and his life is chronicled from the Nativity through the Resurrection. The four Evangelists - Matthew, Mark, Luke and John - accent the original entrance on King Street. These are the only windows designed to be viewed and read from outside the church. The round "Descending Dove" glass above the present entrance complements the stained and painted traditional glass. Symbols of the Christian faith are found in all the windows; the dove, wheat and grapes, lilies and passion flowers, crosses, bibles, staffs and scripture citations from the Old and New Testaments.

Each of the twenty eight windows is different, but together they form a mosaic of color and sunlit beauty that accentuate the dignity and serenity of Trinity Episcopal Church. Between 1991 and 1992, Advent Glass Works conducted an inspection and appraisal, then performed total restoration of twenty-nine windows in the church. Due to the immense value of the windows, new protective glazing was installed.

Organs
An organ constructed by New Yorker Henry Erben was assembled at Trinity in 1857. The organ was disassembled in 1902 and rebuilt with a section of eight foot diapason pipes. 
A three manual, 22-rank Austin Organ, model Opus 504, was placed in the church during 1914 in memory of Junius T. Smith by his widow, Laura. It was used for over 50 years until its deterioration from wood destroying organisms and water seepage was beyond repair.

In 1965, the Vestry formed a committee to research the subject and make a recommendation. The Æeolian-Skinner Organ Company had provided instruments for several prominent institutions, including the Mormon Tabernacle in Salt Lake City and the Cathedral of St. John the Divine in New York City. The committee selected Aeolian-Skinner and a congregational vote confirmed their choice. The organ was ordered in mid-1966 and manufacture was completed a year later. The three manual organ of 41 ranks (2,349 pipes) was installed and dedicated prior to Thanksgiving in 1967.

John Parkyn was Trinity's organist when the Aeolian-Skinner organ was installed. Before 1996, he advised the vestry that the organ required considerable work. He created a renovation plan which included a thorough cleaning, console restoration and replacement or repair of a few groups of pipes. The process was executed over three years and rededicated in January 1999. The newest technology was incorporated which allows a computer to control the organ and digitally reproduce sounds from other notable organs. The Aeolian-Skinner organ still is a 3-manual, but it has 91-ranks instead of 41, making it an Opus 1482 hybrid pipe and digital organ. Instrumental sounds can be created that mimic flutes, oboes, trumpets, harps and chimes.

Carillon
To celebrate the church's 150th anniversary in 1971, Helen Hindry Stephens donated the church's first carillon in her parents' memory. Louis Fitz-James Hindry was church rector for over three decades as well as being her father. Twenty-five years later, she repeated her gift. Helen Stephens died in 2001, and her family honored her memory in November 2003 by presenting the church with an automated carillon that will play a song on the quarter-hour during the day. At 12:30pm and 5pm, a 30-minute program commences.

Notable people
 Eleazer Root (1802-1887), rector of Trinity Parish (1874-1884) and educator

See also

References

External links 
 Trinity Parish Church website
 Diocese of Florida website

Churches completed in 1903
20th-century Episcopal church buildings
Episcopal church buildings in Florida
Churches in St. Augustine, Florida
Churches in St. Johns County, Florida
1821 establishments in Florida Territory